MFSB: The Gamble & Huff Orchestra is the sixth album to be released by Philadelphia International Records houseband MFSB.

Track listing
"Dance with Me Tonight" (Cynthia Biggs, Dexter Wansel)     5:08	
"To Be In Love" (Joseph Jefferson)     5:48
"Let's Party Down" (Leroy Bell, Casey James)     5:56 	
"Wishing on a Star" (Billie Calvin)     5:39	
"Use Ta Be My Guy" (Kenneth Gamble, Leon Huff)     5:15	
"The Way I Feel Today" (Kenneth Gamble, Leon Huff)     4:35 	
"Is It Something I Said" (Leroy Bell, Casey James, Thom Bell)     3:58	
"Redwood Beach"  (Dennis Harris)   4:13

Personnel
Barbara Ingram, Leroy Bell, Casey James, Bill Lamb, Carla Benson, Evette Benton - backing vocals
Anthony Bell - guitar
Leroy Bell - guitar, percussion
Casey James - percussion, synthesizer

Charts

Singles

References

External links
 MFSB-MFSB: The Gamble & Huff Orchestra at Discogs

1978 albums
MFSB albums
Albums produced by Kenneth Gamble
Albums produced by Leon Huff
Albums produced by Thom Bell
Philadelphia International Records albums
Albums recorded at Sigma Sound Studios